The Qissa Khwani Bazaar ("Story-tellers market) is a bazaar in Peshawar, the capital of the Khyber Pakhtunkhwa province of Pakistan.

Background
The Khyber Pakhtunkhwa (then North-West Frontier Province) province Gazetteer, traveller Lowell Thomas and Peshawar's British commissioner Herbert Edwardes called it "the Piccadilly of Central Asia".

History

On 23 April 1930, British Indian Army troops opened fire on a crowd of anti-colonial protestors at the Qissa Khwani Bazaar, killing nearly 400 people.  The colonial authorities ultimately acknowledged that the British Indian Army had killed 179 people in the massacre, which triggered protests across India and catapulted the newly formed Khudai Khidmatgar movement into prominence.

In 2010, 25 people were killed in a bomb attack at a protest against electricity shortages. The market was again targeted by militants in 2013, who used a 220 kg bomb to carry out an attack that killed over 40 people, and damaged a nearby mosque as well as set fire to several historic wooden buildings.

On 4 March 2022, 63 people were killed and 196 others wounded in a suicide attack at a mosque during Jumma prayer.

Kissa Khwani Bazaar is famous for Chai and Qehwa houses, and also because several famous Indian movie actors have origins and family ties in the region. Indian film actor Dilip Kumar was born in Qissa Khwani Bazaar on or about 11 December 1922. He belonged to Awan family. Actor Raj Kapoor and his uncle, actor Trilok Kapoor were also born in the area. Actor Shah Rukh Khan's family still lives in the area.

Gallery

Notable people
 Surinder Kapoor, father of actor Anil Kapoor
 Meer Taj Muhammad Khan, father of Shah Rukh Khan
Trilok Kapoor, Indian actor
 Nasir Khan

See also
 Market (place)
 Retail
 Souq

References 

Economy of Peshawar
Shopping malls in Pakistan
Tourist attractions in Peshawar
Bazaars in Peshawar